The Australian Department of Education was a short-lived department of the Government of Australia in existence between 29 May 2019 and 1 February 2020. It was charged with the responsibility for national policies and programs that help Australians access quality and affordable early childhood education, school education, higher education, vocational education and training, international education and academic research.

The head of the department was the Secretary of the Department of Education, Dr Michele Bruniges AM, who reported to the Minister for Education, the Hon. Dan Tehan MP.

The department merged with the Department of Employment, Skills, Small and Family Business (except small business functions) to form the Department of Education, Skills and Employment on 1 February 2020.

History
The department was formed by way of an Administrative Arrangements Order issued on 29 May 2019. It incorporated the functions of the previous Department of Education and Training, with the exception that:
 vocational education and training and apprenticeships transferred to the Department of Employment, Skills, Small and Family Business; and
 migrant adult education transferred to the Department of Home Affairs.

On 1 February 2020, the department merged with the Department of Employment, Skills, Small and Family Business, excluding the latter's small business functions, to form the Department of Education, Skills and Employment.

Preceding departments
The Department of Education's predecessor departments have been:
 Department of Education and Science (13 December 1966 – 19 December 1972)
 Department of Education (19 December 1972 – 11 March 1983)
 Department of Education and Youth Affairs (11 March 1983 – 13 December 1984)
 Department of Education (13 December 1984 – 24 July 1987)
 Department of Employment, Education and Training (DEET) (24 July 1987 – 11 March 1996)
 Department of Employment, Education, Training and Youth Affairs (DEETYA) (11 March 1996 – 21 October 1998)
 Department of Education, Training and Youth Affairs (DETYA) (21 October 1998 – 26 November 2001)
 Department of Education, Science and Training (DEST) (26 November 2001 – 3 December 2007)
 Department of Education, Employment and Workplace Relations (DEEWR) (3 December 2007 – 18 September 2013)
 Department of Education (18 September 2013 – 23 December 2014)
 Department of Education and Training (23 December 2014 – 29 May 2019)

Operational activities
The functions of the department were broadly classified into the following matters:
Schools education policy and programs, including vocational education and training in schools
Schooling transitions policy and programs including career pathways
Education and training transitions policy and programs
Youth affairs and programs, including youth transitions
Pre-school education policy and programs
Higher education policy, regulation and programs
Policy, coordination and support for international education and research engagement
Coordination of research policy in relation to universities
Creation and development of research infrastructure
Research grants and fellowships
Childcare policy and programmes
Co-ordination of early childhood development policy and responsibilities

See also

 Minister for Education (Australia)
 List of Australian Commonwealth Government entities
 Education in Australia

References

External links
 Department of Education and Training website
 Australian Institute for Teaching and School Leadership Website

2019 establishments in Australia
2020 disestablishments in Australia
Education policy in Australia
Australia
Australia, Education
Public policy in Australia
Defunct government departments of Australia